Casabermeja is a town and municipality in the province of Málaga, part of the autonomous community of Andalusia in southern Spain.  The municipality is situated approximately 20 kilometres from the provincial capital, the city of Malaga.

References

Municipalities in the Province of Málaga